Rough Cut (lit. "A Movie is a Movie") is a 2008 South Korean action film. It is the debut feature of director Jang Hoon and based on an original story by Kim Ki-duk. The film had a total of 1,307,688 admissions nationwide.

Synopsis 
Gang-pae, played by So Ji-sub, is a local organized crime leader who still wishes he could be in movies. Soo-ta, played by Kang Ji-hwan, is a haughty actor who is easy to provoke. Within his latest film, where he plays a gangster, he gets into the role too much and sends one of the stuntmen to the hospital. The two men meet by chance at a room salon and Soo-ta enlists Gang-pae to join the production. But this real-life gangster will only join the production if the fights are real. The two main characters continue to try and one-up the other every chance they get.

Cast 
So Ji-sub as Gang-pae (gangster)  	 	
Kang Ji-hwan as Jang Soo-ta (actor) 	
Hong Soo-hyun as Kang Mi-na (actress)
Park Soo-young as Chief Lee	
Ko Chang-seok as Director Bong (director)
 Song Yong-tae as Chairman Park
 Jang Hee-jin as Eun-sun (Soo-ta's girlfriend)

Blurring of real and fake 
Since this film crosses back and forth between being an actual movie and a movie within a movie, the lines get blurred as to which the audience is watching. Examples:

The character name Soo-ta (수타) is a parody of 스타 meaning "(movie) star" in Korean. And the character name Gang-pae (강패) is a parody of 깡패 which means "gangster" in Korean.
Choreographed fights become "real" and a "real" fight turns out to be planned but is however "real".
The actual movie script for Rough Cut is shown being read and held several times by rehearsing characters and crew within the film.
Numerous members of the actual crew, including the producer and editor, are seen in the film as "crew members".
Various movie posters can be seen including Time also written by Kim Ki-duk and an early draft of a Rough Cut poster, which is the same image on the cover of the scripts.
The "real" arrest of a bloodied Gang-pae for a recent murder turns out to be in image from a film shown in a theater right before the actual credits roll.

Awards and nominations 
2008 Blue Dragon Film Awards
 Best New Actor - So Ji-sub
 Best New Actor - Kang Ji-hwan
 Nomination - Best Supporting Actor - Ko Chang-seok
 Nomination - Best New Director - Jang Hoon

2008 Korean Association of Film Critics Awards
 Best Actor - So Ji-sub
 Best New Director - Jang Hoon
 Best New Actor - Kang Ji-hwan

2008 Korean Film Awards
 Best New Actor - Kang Ji-hwan
 Nomination - Best Film
 Nomination - Best Actor - So Ji-sub
 Nomination - Best Supporting Actor - Ko Chang-seok
 Nomination - Best New Director - Jang Hoon
 Nomination - Best Screenplay - Kim Ki-duk

2008 Director's Cut Awards
 Best Producer - Kim Ki-duk

2009 Asian Film Awards
 Nomination - Best Newcomer - So Ji-sub

2009 Baeksang Arts Awards
 Best New Actor - So Ji-sub
 Best New Actor - Kang Ji-hwan
 Nomination - Best Film
 Nomination - Best New Director - Jang Hoon
 Nomination - Best Screenplay - Kim Ki-duk

2009 Shanghai International Film Festival
 Best Music - Roh Hyoung-woo

2009 Buil Film Awards
 Best New Actor - So Ji-sub

2009 Busan Film Critics Awards
 Best New Actor - So Ji-sub
 Best New Actor - Kang Ji-hwan

2009 Grand Bell Awards
 Best Screenplay - Kim Ki-duk, Jang Hoon, Ok Jin-gon, Oh Se-yeon
 Nomination - Best New Director - Jang Hoon
 Nomination - Best New Actor - So Ji-sub

References

External links 
  
 
 
 

2008 films
2000s crime action films
South Korean independent films
South Korean crime action films
Films about actors
Films about filmmaking
Films about organized crime in South Korea
Films shot in Seoul
Films shot in Incheon
Films directed by Jang Hoon
Sponge Entertainment films
Showbox films
2000s Korean-language films
2008 directorial debut films
2000s South Korean films